Rozita binti Abu Bakar (born March 9, 1971), better known by her stage name Rozita Che Wan or Che Ta, is an actress, a former stewardess also former beauty queen who had won Miss Malaysia Intercontinental 1992 and a publisher in Malaysia. She is well known for the comedy series Kiah Pekasam who managed to put her one of the most popular women's comedy actors.

Despite being famous for comedic characters until she was nominated for several times at the Berita Harian Popular Star Awards, she was nominated for the Best Female Actor (Drama) Screen Awards | Best Actress TV Screen Actor 2011 The Best Female Assistant (Drama) Screen Award | Best Actress TV Screen Actor 2008 Award for serious acting in  Still Hope  and 'Fitrah Worship' 'drama. In addition to her famous acting world, she is also one of the hot women celebrities in social media and has often received public attention, especially about her relationship and marriage with a popular comedy actor with the sitcom "Oh My English!", Zain Saidin.

Filmography

Film

Television series

Telemovie

Television

References

External links
 

1973 births
Living people
Malaysian people of Malay descent
Malaysian actresses
Malaysian television personalities